Sar-i-Ab Railway Station (Balochi:سر آب ریلوے اسٹیشن) is located in Sar-I-Ab village, Quetta district of Balochistan province in Pakistan.

See also
 List of railway stations in Pakistan
 Pakistan Railways

References

Railway stations in Quetta District
Railway stations on Quetta–Taftan Railway Line
Railway stations on Rohri–Chaman Railway Line
Railway stations in Balochistan, Pakistan